Merkel is a city in Taylor County, Texas, United States. Its population was 2,590 at the 2010 census. It is part of the Abilene metropolitan area.

Geography
Merkel is located 17 miles west of Abilene near Interstate Highway 20. The town has a total area of 2.0 square miles (5.1 km), all of it land.

History 
Around 1870, when the Texas and Pacific Railway was built, the city was founded as Windmill Town. In 1881, it was renamed as Merkel in honor of the first settler in this area, S. M. Merkel, from Germany. In 1882, the first mercantile store and in 1883, the first post office opened.

Demographics

2020 census

As of the 2020 United States census, 2,471 people, 875 households, and 640 families were residing in the town.

2000 census
As of the census of 2000,  2,637 people 1,012 households, and 719 families resided in the town. The population density was 1,342.0 people per square mile (519.5/km). The 1,202 housing units averaged 611.7 per square mile (236.8/km). The racial makeup of the town was 89.42% White, 1.14% African American, 0.61% Native American, 0.30% Asian,  6.37% from other races, and 2.16% from two or more races. Hispanics or Latinos of any race were 14.22% of the population.

Of the 1,012 households, 37.9% had children under 18 still living with them, 54.7% were married couples living together, 13.3% had a female householder with no husband present, and 28.9% were not families. About 25.9% of all households were made up of individuals, and 14.7% had someone living alone who was 65 or older. The average household size was 2.56, and the average family size was 3.08.

In the town, the population was distributed as 28.2% under 18, 8.3% from 18 to 24, 27.0% from 25 to 44, 20.7% from 45 to 64, and 15.8% who were 65 or older. The median age was 36 years. For every 100 females, there were 88.2 males. For every 100 females 18 and over, there were 80.3 males.

The median income for a household in the town was $29,083, and for a family was $34,250. Males had a median income of $30,000 versus $16,620 for females. The per capita income for the town was $13,292. About 9.9% of families and 13.6% of the population were below the poverty line, including 14.6% of those under age 18 and 14.0% of those age 65 or over.

Education
The City of Merkel is served by the Merkel Independent School District.

Notable people
Cody Lambert (born 1961), professional rodeo cowboy, was raised in Merkel.
Tommy Robison (born 1961), football player

External links
 City of Merkel
 Merkel Chamber of Commerce
 Merkel in The Handbook of Texas
 The Merkel Area Museum.

Climate
According to the Köppen climate classification, Merkel has a semiarid climate, BSk on climate maps.

References 

Towns in Taylor County, Texas
Towns in Texas
Abilene metropolitan area